Steve Naraina (born 23 October 1966) is a Mauritian boxer. He competed in the men's bantamweight event at the 1996 Summer Olympics.

References

External links
 

1966 births
Living people
Mauritian male boxers
Olympic boxers of Mauritius
Boxers at the 1996 Summer Olympics
Place of birth missing (living people)
Bantamweight boxers